Welches is a populated place in the parish of Christ Church, Barbados. It is a coastal area located on the south coast of Barbados. Welches Beach is a beach located in Welches.

A sea wall was constructed in Welches to protect the coastal highway. Its construction began in 1999, and it is around 215 meters in length.

Business
Some guesthouses and inns exist in Welches. The International Refills Company Ltd. is located in Welches, and is involved in aspects of diaper disposal components and systems.

See also
 List of cities, towns and villages in Barbados

Notes

References

External links
 Welches on Internet Tourist Database

Christ Church, Barbados
Populated coastal places in Barbados
Populated places in Barbados